William Jeremiah Tuttle (February 21, 1882 – February 22, 1930) was an American freestyle swimmer and water polo player who represented the United States at the 1904 Summer Olympics in St. Louis, Missouri. He was born in Chicago, Illinois, and died in Los Angeles, California.

In the 1904 Olympics, he won silver medals as a member of the U.S. 4x50-yard freestyle relay team and as a member of Chicago Athletic Association water polo team. He also competed in the 200m obstacle course in the previous Olympic competition (1900), failing to place in the individual event.

See also
 List of athletes with Olympic medals in different disciplines
 List of Olympic medalists in swimming (men)

References

External links

1882 births
1930 deaths
American male freestyle swimmers
American male water polo players
Olympic medalists in water polo
Olympic silver medalists for the United States in swimming
Olympic water polo players of the United States
Swimmers from Chicago
Swimmers at the 1904 Summer Olympics
Water polo players at the 1904 Summer Olympics
Medalists at the 1904 Summer Olympics
Water polo players from Chicago